Lymphomatoid papulosis (LyP) is a rare skin disorder.

Prevalence
The overall prevalence rate of lymphomatoid papulosis is estimated at at least 1.2 cases per 1,000,000 population. This rare condition has only been studied in depth since 1968.

Presentation
It can appear very similar to anaplastic large cell lymphoma.
Type "A" is CD30 positive, while type "B" is CD30 negative.

It has been described as "clinically benign but histologically malignant."

Treatment
It may respond to methotrexate or PUVA.

Prognosis
It can evolve into lymphoma.

See also 
 Cutaneous T-cell lymphoma
 Parapsoriasis
 Secondary cutaneous CD30+ large cell lymphoma
 List of cutaneous conditions

References

External links 

Rare diseases
Lymphoid-related cutaneous conditions